Shakeel Shabbir Ahmed (born 1953 in Kisumu) is a Kenyan politician. He belongs to the Orange Democratic Movement and was elected to represent the Kisumu Town East Constituency in the National Assembly of Kenya since the 2007 Kenyan parliamentary election.

He went to the Nairobi School and graduated in 1971. He then went to Makerere University in Uganda, but left after only one year's studies to join Middlesex Polytechnic in London, where he received a Diploma in Accountancy and later bachelor's degree in Business studies and he  received the Master of Business Administration from the Henley Management College and later on did the Masters in political science at  Maseno University. Shakeel Shabbir Ahmed has been the chairman of New Nyanza Provincial General Hospital for eleven years and been in health management for the last thirty years.

References

1953 births
Living people
Orange Democratic Movement politicians
Members of the 11th Parliament of Kenya
Alumni of Middlesex University
Alumni of Nairobi School
Kenyan politicians of Indian descent
Kenyan Muslims